Ho bisogno di vederti is the title of the song which was the entry of the San Remo music festival in 1965. It was released there and was released after Connie Francis and Gigliola Cinquetti.

Background 
Both Connie Francis and Gigliola Cinquetti were invited to play "Ho bisogno di vederti" and use two orchestral arrangements to emphasize the importance of competition as a composer's competition. Two different artists. In the 1965 edition of San Remo Music Festival, each entry had to be presented.

This song was in the semi-finals, finishing fifth in the ranking after the last night of the festival on January 30, 1965.

Connie Francis

Initial release: MGM Records single K 2102 
Recording of Connie Francis' s "Ho bisogno di vederti" was first released before the Sanremo Music Festival. As the Sanremo entry got more attention, British numbers chosen for the B side were # 43 Billboard Hot 100 and # 7 Billboard who broke through Tonight, Ted Murry and Benny Davis' songs Adult Contemporary Chart.

Other releases: MGM Records Single K 2109 
The second edition of "Ho bisogno di vederti" came after the success of the festival. Now another Italian song was chosen for side B, 'C'è una cosa che non sai' ', album' 'Connaie Francis' song released in the United States for 'better' "for mama Interestingly, "C'è una cosa che non sai" also appeared on the A side of a single published between both versions of "Ho bisogno di vederti". In that scene, "C'è una cosa chen non sai" was with the Italian version of Francis.

English version 
Francis recorded the English version "You are mine (when you are lonely)". As opposed to the original chorus of Italian lyrics being left, the entire lyrics were omitted, so in contrast to the original 3 minutes 30 seconds run time of the Italian version, execution of the English version The time was only 2:56 minutes.

"You are mine (just when you are lonely)" was released as the B side of Francis' single "Wishing It Was You".

Unregistered German version 
The German version entitled "Ich muss immer one dich denken" was scheduled to be picked up at Philips Studios in London on May 26, 1965. There, Francis and some other German songs, Tony Hatch. However, "During my busy day, I was not registered due to a delay in my busy recording schedule."

Gigliola Cinquetti recording

Italian version
Gigliola Cinquetti's version of Ho bisogno di vederti was released in Italy on Cinquetti's label Compagnia Generale del Disco.

German version
Unlike Connie Francis, Gigliola Cinquetti did indeed record Ich muss immer an dich denken, the German version of Ich muss immer an dich denken. It was released in Germany on Italia Records Single # 2031.

References

1965 singles
Connie Francis songs
1965 songs
MGM Records singles
Compagnia Generale del Disco singles